Nazirabad may refer to:

 Nazirabad, Bhopal, a village in Madhya Pradesh, India
 Nazirabad railway station, Pakistan